Ali Ansar was an Indian politician belonging to Communist Party of India. He was elected as a member of West Bengal Legislative Assembly from Kalyanpur in 1972. He died on 30 November 2015 at the age of 86.

References

1920s births
2015 deaths
Communist Party of India politicians from West Bengal
West Bengal MLAs 1972–1977